Reckenfeld is a railway station located in Reckenfeld, Germany.

History
The station is located on the Münster–Rheine line. The train services are operated by Deutsche Bahn and the WestfalenBahn.

Train services
The following services currently call at Reckenfeld:

Railway stations in North Rhine-Westphalia